"Ajab Si"(English: In Your Eyes), also known as Aankhon Mein Teri, is a Hindi song from the soundtrack of 2007 film Om Shanti Om. The song is composed by Vishal–Shekhar and written by Vishal Dadlani and sung by KK. It is picturised upon Shah Rukh Khan and Deepika Padukone. Along with "Ankhiyon Ke Jharokhon Se," it is considered as one of the iconic songs that Bollywood has produced.

Background
The song conveys feelings of one-sided love of Shah Rukh Khan towards Deepika Padukone.

In popular culture
New Zealand cricketer Ross Taylor posted a picture of him on Twitter, while going for the removal of his Pterygium (surfer's eye). Reacting to his tweet Indian cricketer Virender Sehwag wrote the opening lines of the song, wishing speedy recovery of him.

References

2007 songs
Hindi film songs
Songs with lyrics by Vishal Dadlani
Songs with music by Vishal–Shekhar